Telefon Ridge is a ridge rising west of Telefon Bay on Deception Island, in the South Shetland Islands. Named from association with Telefon Bay by the United Kingdom Antarctic Place-Names Committee (UK-APC) in 1959.

See also
Mount Uritorco

References
 SCAR Composite Antarctic Gazetteer.

Ridges of Antarctica
Geography of Deception Island